SRS Labs, Inc. was a Santa Ana, California-based audio technology engineering company that specialized in audio enhancement solutions for wide variety of consumer electronic devices. Originally a part of Hughes Aircraft Company, the audio division developed the Sound Retrieval System technology, and in  1993 was separated off to form SRS Labs, Inc. In 1996 SRS Labs became a publicly traded company on Nasdaq, SRSL.

The company developed audio enhancement solutions and licenses those products to companies including Microsoft, Samsung Group, LG Group, Toshiba, Vizio, Dell, Hewlett-Packard, Sony, ViewSonic, Sharp Corporation, Haier, and Hisense.

In 2008, approximately 36 million SRS-equipped flat-panel TVs were shipped, representing a 30-percent estimated market share.

SRS Labs had more than three hundred consumer electronics manufacturing partners, and more than 150 patents for its technologies. SRS manufactured its own products, including, MyVolume - Volume Leveling Adaptor, SRS iWOW for iTunes, SRS Audio Sandbox for PC, and SRS iWOW Adaptor for iPod.

In 2012, SRS Labs was acquired by DTS, Inc. and was run as a subsidiary but has now been fully absorbed into the DTS parent company.

Products
The company licensed and produced a number of products including:
 TruVolume
 StudioSound HD
 TruSurround HD
 TruSurround XT
 TheaterSound (Equipped only on high-end Samsung 2010 Televisions.(Series 6 and above) and Samsung 2011 Televisions.(Series 5 and below)
 TheaterSound HD (Equipped only on high-end Samsung 2011 Televisions.(Series 6 and above) and T27A950 3D TV monitor.)
 Headphone 360
 TruSurround HD4
 TruBass
 Dialog Clarity
 WOW HD
 TruMedia (for Android devices based on Qualcomm MS7x27 series)
 Circle Surround
 CS Headphone
 CS Auto

See also 

 Sound Retrieval System
 DTS (sound system)

References

External links
 Official Site.
 SRS' Sounding Off Blog.

Hughes Aircraft Company
Xperi
Companies established in 1993
Companies formerly listed on the Nasdaq
Companies based in California